Wilhelm von Bibra (1442–1490) (Eques auratus) was a Papal emissary.

Papal emissary
Wilhelm functioned as a Papal Emissary for both the archbishop of Cologne and Kaiser Friedrich.  Wilhelm’s half brother, Prince Bishop Lorenz von Bibra of Würzburg, in 1487  wrote a letter of introduction to Pope Innocent VIII for Wilhelm who was being sent to the Vatican as emissary of Archbishop Herman of Cologne. As an emissary, he traveled to Rome three times: 1483, 1487, and 1490. By July 8, 1490, Wilhelm was referred to as "miles auratus" (a reference to him being a Knight of the Golden Spur).  In 1490, Wilhelm became ill when returning from Rome as an emissary of the emperor Frederick III. He was a guest at the Palazzo of the countly Pellegrini family when he died August 28, 1490. Wilhelm's tomb stone is still to be seen in the Pellegrini Chapel of the Santa Anastasia in Verona. Originally, it was on the floor and was moved to the wall in summer of 1804.

von Bibra family

Wilhelm was a member of the aristocratic Franconian von Bibra family which among its members were Wilhelm’s half brother, Lorenz von Bibra Prince-Bishop of Würzburg, Duke in Franconia, Conrad von Bibra, Prince-Bishop of Würzburg, Duke in Franconia (1490-1544), Heinrich von Bibra, Prince-Bishop, Prince-Abbot of Fulda (1711-1788) and Ernst von Bibra (1806-1878), naturalist and author.

Description of inscription on grave
NOBILIS ET STRENN(uus) D(ominus) GULIELMUS DE BIBRA
EQUES AUREUS DUCATU FRANCIAE ORIENTAL(is)
ORIUNDUS SERENISS(imi) D(omini) FRIEDERICI III CAESARIS INVICTISS(imi) ET MASSI=
MILIANI EIUS NATI, INCLITI ROMANORUM REGIS CONSILIAR(ius) AD S(anctum) D(ominum) N(ostrum) INNO=
CENTIUM PAP(am) VIII ORATOR ET NUNTIUS ATQUE REVER[endissimi) D(omini) HERMANNI ARCHI(e)PI(scopi)
COLONIENSIS PRINCIP(is) ELECTOR(is) MAGIS(ter) CURIAE CONSILIAR(ius) COMPLETA LEGATIONE EX RO(ma) DOMUM REGREDITUR(us)
OBIIT IN HAC INCLITA URBE VERONAE DIE 28. AUG(usti)
ANNO MCCCCXC CUIUS ANIMA REQUIESCAT IN PACE

PEREGRINORUM FAMILIA PIET(ate) ET GRATIA HUNC MIHI SOLI
IN HOC SUO SACELLO TUMULUM CONCESSIT MCCCCXC

“The noble and strict Wilhelm von Bibra, Knight of the Golden Spur, from the Duchy of Eastern Franconia, adviser of the most noble and invincible emperor, Frederick III. and his son Maximilian, the well-known Roman king, representative and envoy to our Holy Lord Innocent VIII, as well as Court Administrator and councilor of the Archbishop of Cologne, Elector Hermann. After completing his mission on the way home from Rome, he died in the famous city of Verona on August 28, 1490. May his soul rest in peace! "

At the feet of the representation:

“Out of piety and grace, the Pellegrini family gave me a grave in their chapel just for me. 1490. "

References
Altfrankische Bilder 60. Jahrgang 1961, Universitaetsdruckerei H. Stuertz AG. Wuerzburg, p.4-5 
WILHELM FRHR. VON BIBRA, Geschicte der Familie der Freiherrn von Bibra, 1870;
 Wilhelm Freiherr von Bibra: Beiträge zur Familien Geschichte der Reichsfreiherrn von Bibra. (Vol. 2), 1882,  Universitäts- und Landesbibliothek Düsseldorf, P. 251-269.
WERNER WAGENHÖFER, Die Bibra: Studien und Materialien zur Genealogie und zur Besitzgeschichte einer fränkischen Niederadelsfamilie im Spätmittelalter, Verlag Degener & Co, 1998, 699 pages, ;

External links
Wilhelm von Bibra web page

Wilhelm von Bibra
1442 births
1490 deaths
German diplomats